Ramón Díaz Cruz (born 19 August 1946), known as Ramoní, is a Spanish former professional footballer who played as a midfielder.

Career
Born in Cádiz, Ramoní played for Espanyol, Granada, Barcelona, Sevilla and CD San Fernando.

References

1946 births
Living people
Spanish footballers
RCD Espanyol footballers
Granada CF footballers
FC Barcelona players
Sevilla FC players
CD San Fernando players
La Liga players
Association football midfielders